The 1985 NCAA Rifle Championships were contested at the sixth annual competition to determine the team and individual national champions of NCAA co-ed collegiate rifle shooting in the United States. The championship was held at the United States Military Academy in West Point, New York. 

Murray State, with a team score of 6,150, won their first team title, finishing one point ahead of two-time defending champions West Virginia. The Racers were coached by Elvis Green. 

The individual champions were, for the smallbore rifle, Pat Spurgin (Murray State) and, for the air rifle, Christian Hellern (West Virginia). Spurgin won the previous year's air rifle title.

Qualification
Since there is only one national collegiate championship for rifle shooting, all NCAA rifle programs (whether from Division I, Division II, or Division III) were eligible. A total of seven teams ultimately contested this championship.

Results
Scoring:  The championship consisted of 120 shots by each competitor in smallbore and 40 shots per competitor in air rifle.

Team title

Individual events

References

NCAA Rifle Championship
NCAA Rifle Championships
1985 in shooting sports
NCAA Rifle Championships